Sumi Khadka (born c. 1978) is a Nepalese actress and beauty queen. She was crowned Miss Nepal 1995.

Filmography

External links
 Miss Nepal Official Website

Living people
Actors from Kathmandu
Miss Nepal winners
Nepalese film actresses
Nepalese female models
Actresses in Nepali cinema
Nepalese beauty pageant winners
20th-century Nepalese actresses
1978 births
Date of birth missing (living people)